Oomyzus gallerucae is a species of chalcid wasp in the family Eulophidae. It is a parasitoid of the elm leaf beetle. The adults and larvae eat the eggs of the beetle.

The species can be found in countries like France, Iran, Australia, and the United States.

References

Eulophidae